Marcus Geganius Macerinus was a Roman statesman who served as Consul in 447, 443, and 437 BC, and as Censor in 435 BC.

Family 
Geganius came from the rather small patrician Gegania gens, which had only once before risen to the consulship, this when Titus Geganius Macerinus held it in 492 BC. Geganius shares his praenomen with that of his father, an otherwise unattested Marcus Geganius who should probably be seen as a descendant of the consul of 492 or his brother, Lucius Geganius Macerinus. He had a (younger) brother, Proculus Geganius Macerinus, who became consul in 440 BC. His grandsons (or grandnephews), Lucius Geganius Macerinus and Marcus Geganius Macerinus, would become consular tribunes in 378 and 367 BC respectively.

Career 
Geganius was elected as consul in 447 BC together with Gaius Julius Iulus. According to Livy, he and his colleague concerned themselves with easing the tensions between the classes. They also carried out a war against the Volscians.

Geganius held the consulship for a second time in 443 BC, this time together with another repeated consular, Titus Quinctius Capitolinus Barbatus. Geganius relieved Ardea from Volscian attacks and made Cloelius, the Volscian commander, his prisoner. For this he was awarded and celebrated a triumph. A new magistrate was created during this year, that of the censorship, to free the consuls from the holding of the census and to focus on military affairs.

Geganius held a third and final consulship in 437 BC with first time consul Lucius Sergius Fidenas. Geganius fought the Veientes south of the Anio, and although he defeated his foe the victory came at heavy loss for the Romans. His co-consular Sergius gained his cognomen Fidenas for his victories against the Fidenae. Possibly because of the heavy losses against the Veientes or for reasons otherwise unknown, Geganius abdicated his consulship and was replaced by Marcus Valerius Lactuca Maximus. The year would see further changes within the Roman leadership as a dictator, Mamercus Aemilius Mamercinus, was appointed. Aemilius successfully fought the Veii, Falerii and Fidenae.

Geganius' last known major magistracy is that of censor in 435 BC together with Gaius Furius Pacilus Fusus. They approved the construction of the Villa Publica in the Campus Martius and when finished they completed the census there. A new law was approved during their censorship which limited the term to one and a half year, down from the previous term of five years. The classicist scholar Mommsen argues that with the erection and approval of the Villa Publica that Geganius and Furius should be considered the first historically authentic censors.

Geganius would later serve under the dictator Aulus Postumius Tubertus, fighting against the Aequi and Volsci at Mount Algidus in 431 BC; he might have served as a Legatus, but his exact title and role in the fighting is not known.

See also 
 Gegania (gens)

References 

5th-century BC Roman consuls
Macerinus, Marcus